National figure skating championships for the 2020–21 season were scheduled to take place mainly from December 2020 to January 2021. They were held to crown national champions and served as part of the selection process for international events, such as the 2021 ISU Championships. Medals were awarded in the disciplines of men's singles, ladies' singles, pair skating, and ice dance. A few countries chose to organize their national championships together with their neighbors; the results were subsequently divided into national podiums.

Competitions 
Competition schedules were subject to change due to the ongoing global COVID-19 pandemic.

Key

Postponed

Cancelled

Senior medalists

Senior men

Senior ladies

Senior pairs

Senior ice dance

Junior medalists

Junior men

Junior ladies

Junior pairs

Junior ice dance

References 

Nationals
Nationals
Figure skating national championships